Your Place or Mine? is a 2015 Filipino romantic comedy-drama film directed by Joel Lamangan and starring Andi Eigenmann, Bret Jackson and Andre Paras. It was released by Viva Films on April 29, 2015.

Cast 
 Andi Eigenmann as Haley Saavedra
 Bret Jackson as Russell Sandoval
 Andre Paras as Seth Borromeo
 Anja Aguilar as Micah Angeles
 Donnalyn Bartolome as Jessica Villareal
 Clint Bondad as Hans Saavedra
 Gerard Garcia as Ralph Sandoval
 Imee Hart as Vanessa
 Jovic Monsod as Vince Yu
 Ashley Rivera as Camille

See also 
List of Filipino films in 2015
List of Philippine films based on Wattpad stories

References

External links 
 

2015 films
Philippine romantic comedy-drama films
2015 romantic comedy-drama films
2010s Tagalog-language films
Viva Films films
2015 comedy films
2015 drama films
Films directed by Joel Lamangan
2010s English-language films